The  is a railway museum in Saitama, Saitama, Japan, which opened on 14 October 2007. It was built and is operated by the East Japan Railway Culture Foundation, a non-profit affiliate of the East Japan Railway Company (JR East). It consists of a 19,800 m² building on a site covering 42,500 m², with a display area 9,500 m² in size.

The museum features about 30 railway cars, train cab simulators, railway model dioramas, mini trains, storage for artifacts and books, video booths, a multi-purpose hall, a gallery balcony, a cafeteria, a museum shop, and a research room.

Facility

The museum places emphasis on learning through interactive experiences and is mainly divided into two zones: the history zone and the learning zone. The history zone recounts the history of railway technology with the help of trains that were in service in the past. In the learning zone, visitors can gain knowledge of the principles and mechanisms of railway with the use of actual parts and models. The tour of the museum takes roughly two hours with extra time for interactive exhibits.

A library room, known as the "Teppaku Reading Room" opened on 21 July 2012 in the remodelled North Wing of the museum.

History

This museum also opened as the Railway Museum under the elevated railway track near Tokyo Station celebrating the beginning of the 50th year of the railways in Japan on 14 October 1921. In 1936, the Railway Museum was relocated to the new facility built in the place of former building of Manseibashi Station, which station continued to operate until 1943 as an accessory of the museum. The museum was renamed the Transportation Museum in 1948 to cover various means of transportation. On 14 May 2006, the museum was closed pending a move to the new Railway Museum in Saitama.

In November 2012, it was announced that the Railway Museum would form a sister-museum alliance with the National Railway Museum in York, UK.

Driving simulators
The museum features driving simulators that allow visitors to experience being drivers of a D51 steam locomotive, a Shinkansen train, and trains on the Tokaido Line, the Keihin Tohoku Line, and the Yamanote Line.  Simulators require a reservation obtained via reservation terminals installed in the museum and cost 500 yen.  The D51 simulator is appropriate for junior high school students and older, the other simulators allow elementary school students as well.

Exhibits
The following full-size vehicles are on display.

Locomotives

Class 150 steam locomotive – No. 1, the first locomotive to operate in Japan
Class 1290 steam locomotive – No. 1292 Zenko
JNR Class 7100 steam locomotive – No. 7101 Benkei
JNR Class 9850 Mallet steam locomotive – No. 9856, cut away to show internal workings
JNR Class C51 steam locomotive – No. C51 5
JNR Class C57 steam locomotive – No. C57 135, the locomotive that hauled the last scheduled steam service in 1975
Class DD13 diesel locomotive – No. DD13 1
 electric locomotive – No. ED17 1
Class ED40 electric locomotive – No. ED40 10
Class EF55 electric locomotive – No. EF55 1 (since 12 April 2015)
Class EF58 electric locomotive – No. EF58 89
Class EF66 electric locomotive – No. EF66 11
Class ED75 electric locomotive – No. ED75 775

Electric railcars
Hanifu1 passenger and luggage carriage (formerly car De963)
Class Nade 6110 electric railcar – No. Nade 6141
Class Kumoha 40 electric railcar – No. Kumoha 40074
101 series electric multiple unit car – No. Kumoha 101-902
181 series electric multiple unit car – No. Kuha 181-45
455 series electric multiple unit car – No. Kumoha 455-1
485 series electric multiple unit car – No. Kuha 481-26
485 series electric multiple unit car – No. Moha 484-61
0 Series Shinkansen car – No. 21-2
0 Series Shinkansen car – No. 21-25 (cab section only)
200 Series Shinkansen car – No. 222-35
400 Series Shinkansen car – No. 411-3 
E1 Series Shinkansen car – No. E153-104

Diesel railcars

Class KiHa 41300 railcar – No. KiHa 41056
Class KiHa 11 railcar  – No. KiHa 11 25

Passenger carriages
 Kotoku 5010 Kaitakushi passenger carriage
 31 series passenger carriage – No. Oha 31026
 Maite 39 passenger carriage – No. Maite 39 11
 20 series sleeping car – No. Nahanefu 22 1

Imperial carriages
Imperial Carriage No. 1 – first one of the cars so numbered
Imperial Carriage No. 2 – first one of the cars so numbered
Imperial Carriage No. 7
Imperial Carriage No. 9
Imperial Carriage No. 10
Imperial Carriage No. 12

Freight vehicles
 Remufu10000 refrigerator wagon – No. Remufu 10000
 Koki50000 container wagon – No. Koki 50000

The English class names of the cars and locomotives listed above are largely based on the English version of Floor Guide of the museum as of October 2007.

Access
The museum is located adjacent to Tetsudō-Hakubutsukan Station on the New Shuttle people mover, one stop from Ōmiya Station, a hub station of the JR East system. The museum has a limited number of parking spaces.

Address
3-47 Ōnari-chō, Ōmiya-ku, Saitama-shi, Saitama-ken 330-0852

Extension
A new four-storey extension south building opened in summer 2018. Originally planned to be a five-storey structure opening in autumn 2017, the plans were revised and scaled down in 2016 to reduce excessive costs.

See also
 Kyoto Railway Museum, JR West counterpart in Kyoto
 SCMaglev and Railway Park, JR Central counterpart in Nagoya

References

External links

Railway Museum 
Railway Museum 
East Japan Railway Culture Foundation 
Photos of the Railway Museum

Museums established in 2007
Buildings and structures in Saitama (city)
Museums in Saitama Prefecture
Railway museums in Japan
2007 establishments in Japan
East Japan Railway Company